The Thunderstorm is a 1957 Hong Kong drama film directed by Ng Wui and starring Bruce Lee based on the play Thunderstorm by Chinese dramatist Cao Yu. Originally filmed and released in Cantonese in 1957, The Thunderstorm was dubbed into Mandarin for re-release during the 1970s in Hong Kong when Lee shot to superstardom during the time when Mandarin films dominated Hong Kong cinema.

Cast
 Bruce Lee as Chow Chung
 Yin Pak as Lui Shi-ping
 Cheung Ying as Chow Ping
 Mui Yee as Tse Fung
 Man-lei Wong as Fan Yee 
 Ng Wui as Lu Kuei
 Lo Tan as father
 Lo Tun as Chow Pok-yuen
 Lee Ching as Lo Tai-hoi
 Law Lan
 Yip Ping
 Yuet-ching Lee
 Lee Pang-fei

See also
Bruce Lee filmography
Thunderstorm

External links

The Thunderstorm at Hong Kong Cinemagic

The Thunderstorm

1957 films
1957 drama films
Hong Kong drama films
Hong Kong black-and-white films
1950s Cantonese-language films
Incest in film
Hong Kong films based on plays
Films shot in Hong Kong
Hong Kong historical films